Andrew David McKirahan (born February 8, 1990) is an American former professional baseball pitcher. He played in Major League Baseball (MLB) for the Atlanta Braves.

Career

Amateur
McKirahan graduated from Georgetown High School in 2009, and played college baseball at the University of Texas at Austin. In 2010, he played collegiate summer baseball with the Wareham Gatemen of the Cape Cod Baseball League.

Chicago Cubs
He was drafted by the Chicago Cubs in the 21st round of the 2011 Major League Baseball Draft. He suffered an arm injury in 2012 that required Tommy John surgery, and missed a year as a result.

Miami Marlins
The Miami Marlins selected McKirahan from the Cubs in the Rule 5 draft held in December 2014.

Atlanta Braves
The Braves claimed McKirahan off waivers at the end of spring training in 2015. He was placed on the team's Opening Day roster. McKirahan made his major league debut on April 12, 2015, giving up a sacrifice fly in  innings against the New York Mets. On April 20, 2015 McKirahan was suspended for eighty games of the 2015 season after testing positive for performance-enhancing drugs. He was also fined $221,858 of his league minimum $507,500 salary.

McKirahan was invited to spring training in 2016 and made one five-pitch appearance before tearing the ulnar collateral ligament of the elbow. The injury required another Tommy John surgery, for which McKirahan missed the season.

Cincinnati Reds
On February 12, 2017, McKirahan was traded along with minor league pitcher Carlos Portuondo to the Cincinnati Reds in exchange for second baseman Brandon Phillips. He was released on March 17, 2018.

Sugar Land Skeeters
On March 26, 2018, McKirahan signed with the Sugar Land Skeeters of the Atlantic League of Professional Baseball. He was released prior to the season on April 24, 2018.

See also
List of Major League Baseball players suspended for performance-enhancing drugs
Rule 5 draft results

References

External links

Texas Longhorns bio

1990 births
Living people
People from Georgetown, Texas
Baseball players from Texas
Major League Baseball pitchers
Major League Baseball players suspended for drug offenses
American sportspeople in doping cases
Atlanta Braves players
Texas Longhorns baseball players
Wareham Gatemen players
Arizona League Cubs players
Boise Hawks players
Peoria Chiefs players
Kane County Cougars players
Daytona Cubs players
Tennessee Smokies players
Gwinnett Braves players
Mississippi Braves players
Arizona League Reds players
Billings Mustangs players
Pensacola Blue Wahoos players
La Crosse Loggers players